The i-REAL is a 'Personal Mobility Concept' made by automotive giant Toyota that was planned to be put on sale sometime around 2010. It is a development of previous Toyota Personal Mobility vehicles including the i-unit and Toyota i-swing. As with said previous vehicles, the i-REAL is a 3-wheeled electrically powered one-passenger vehicle, running on lithium-ion batteries.

In Low-Speed Mode, the vehicle is upright, and moves around at 'walking pace' at similar eyesight height to pedestrians, without taking up a large amount of space. In High-Speed Mode, the Toyota extends in length by leaning back and extending the single rear wheel to improve aerodynamics and stability, thus being able to achieve a speed of 18.6 mph, or 30 km/h. It leans into corners, like other tall, one-man vehicles such as the Segway, to prevent it from tipping over.

There are two joysticks, one for each hand. Either joystick controls the i-Real, so left- and right-handed people will be equally at home. You push the joystick forwards to go forwards, left to go left, right to go right and pull back to stop. Perimeter-monitoring sensors detect when a collision with a person or object is imminent and alerts the driver by emitting a noise and vibrating. At the same time, it alerts people around it of its movements through use of light and sound.

The i-REAL was driven on the BBC's motoring programme Top Gear in 2008 by Richard Hammond. (Series 12)

References

External links

https://web.archive.org/web/20090816182954/http://www2.toyota.co.jp/en/tech/p_mobility/i-real/
http://www.carmagazine.co.uk/Drives/Search-Results/First-drives/Toyota-i-Real-concept/
https://gizmodo.com/gadgets/drive-slow/toyota-i+real-concept-car-309614.php

I-REAL
Production electric cars
Articles containing video clips